Tipler is an unincorporated community in the town of Tipler, Florence County, Wisconsin, United States. The community is located within Nicolet National Forest.

References

Unincorporated communities in Florence County, Wisconsin
Unincorporated communities in Wisconsin
Iron Mountain micropolitan area